The Great British Baking Show (season 1) may refer to:

 The Great British Bake Off (series 1)
 The Great British Bake Off (series 5), broadcast as the first season of the series on PBS in the United States

See also
 The Great British Baking Show (season 5) (disambiguation)